Grzegorz Zenon Schreiber (born 14 February 1961 in Bydgoszcz, Poland) is a Polish politician who is a current Marshal of Łódź Voivodeship. Between 1991 and 1993 he was Sejm member. He was Bydgoszcz City Councillors also (2002–2006).

In 1986 he graduated philology in Pedagogical University, current Kazimierz Wielki University in Bydgoszcz. Between 1987 and 1991 he worked as teacher in Primary School in Kotomierz. In 1991 he was a principal of 16th Primary School in Bydgoszcz. In 1990s he was the President of multi-sport club Polonia Bydgoszcz (BKS Polonia).

In 1991 parliamentary election he joined the Sejm of Poland (the lower house) I term representing the 17th district (Bydgoszcz), running on the Catholic Election Action list. In 1993 election he was not elected.

Between 1994 and 1995 he was a Vice-President (=Vice-Mayor) of Bydgoszcz.

In 1997 parliamentary election he joined the Sejm of Poland again III term representing the 6th district (Bydgoszcz), running on the Solidarity Electoral Action list. In 2001 election he was not elected.

In 2002 local election he joined the Bydgoszcz City Council IV term representing the 3rd district. He polled 1,178 votes and was first on the Law and Justice list.

In January 2006 he was nominated as the Under-Secretary of State (podsekretarz stanu) in the Ministry of Sport of Poland in Cabinet of Kazimierz Marcinkiewicz

In 2006 local election he joined the Regional Assembly III term representing the 1st district. He scored 8,547 votes, running on the Law and Justice list. Assembly elected him as Vice-Chairperson of the Assembly (Wiceprzewodniczący Sejmiku Województwa Kujawsko-Pomorskiego).

In 2007 parliamentary election he candidated to the Sejm of Poland again. He polled 5,364 votes and was first candidate who was not elected from Law and Justice list in Bydgoszcz district.

After 2018 local election Grzegorz Schreiber was chosen by Łódź Regional Assembly to be a Łódź Voivodeship Marshal.

See also
 Sejm of the Republic of Poland
 Kuyavian-Pomeranian Regional Assembly

References

External links
 (pl) Sejm webside (1991-93 term) 
 (pl) Sejm webside (1997-2001 term) 
 (pl) Kuyavian-Pomeranian Regional Assembly webside

1961 births
Members of the Polish Sejm 1991–1993
Members of the Polish Sejm 1997–2001
Members of Kuyavian-Pomeranian Regional Assembly
Kazimierz Wielki University in Bydgoszcz alumni
Members of the Polish Sejm 2011–2015
Living people
Members of Bydgoszcz City Council
Voivodeship marshals of Poland
Łódź Voivodeship
Christian National Union politicians
Solidarity Electoral Action politicians